Postcards is a Lebanese dream pop/indie rock band formed in early 2013. They have released three EPs, Lakehouse (2013), What Lies So Still (2015), and Here Before (2017). Their first full-length record, I'll be here in the morning, was released on the 26th of January 2018, via Ruptured Records and T3 Records.

History
Postcards was formed in the summer of 2012 in Lebanon when cousins Marwan Tohme and Pascal Semerdjian met Julia Sabra through mutual friends while on a camping trip. They were joined by Rany on the bass a few months later. The band started off by playing the pub circuit across Beirut, performing a varied repertoire of both English and American folk-rock music, gradually building a loyal fan base while writing the songs that would become their first EP Lakehouse released in the fall of 2013, which was described by one reviewer as "down-to-earth, gentle, yet packed with energy".

The band started working on their second EP in late 2014 in Beirut with producer Fadi Tabbal from Tunefork Studios, and ‘What Lies So Still’ was released in early summer 2015 to excellent reviews. On this EP, there is a clear departure from the basic 'rootsy' foundation of their earlier songs, and the band investigates new territory, both structurally and sonically. In the words of Adam Grundey from Triplew.me, the 6 songs are "more complex, less conventional, and all the richer for it (...) The sound of a self-confident group of artists pushing themselves to articulate, musically and lyrically, what they’re feeling, What Lies So Still is a gorgeous set of songs that feel utterly genuine and built-to-last.”

Here Before EP was released in the spring of 2017 in limited quantities around Germany, Austria and Switzerland, via T3 Records (Berlin).

Postcards released their first full-length album I'll be here in the morning on January 26, 2018 via Ruptured (LB), T3 Records (GAS), and Cargo Records (UK) teaming up once again with producer Fadi Tabbal. The constant oscillation between the opposite states of mind that the band deals with in their country runs deep within the album; the lyrics reveal a young woman caught between hope and disillusionment and the music complements those contradicting feelings with instrumentation that nods to dream pop, noise rock, shoegaze and jangle pop.

Postcards have played shows all across Lebanon, toured Jordan, Dubai, the UK, France, Portugal, Italy and recently in Berlin - Germany. They also opened for Beirut and Angus and Julia Stone, and performed at festivals in Lebanon and abroad (Wilderness Festival., Byblos International Festival, Wickerpark Festival).

Discography

Albums 

 I'll be here in the morning - 2018
 The Good Soldier - 2020
 After the Fire, Before the End -  2021

EPs
 Lakehouse - 2013
 What Lies So Still - 2015
 Here Before - 2017

Singles 
 2013: "Oh The Places We Will Go"
 2014: "Where the Wild Ones"
 2015: "Walls"
 2017: "Bright Lights"
 2019: "Fossilized"

References

Lebanese rock music groups
Lebanese pop music groups